A penguin is a flightless bird from the Southern Hemisphere.

Penguin or penguins may also refer to:

Arts and entertainment 
Penguin (album), by Fleetwood Mac
Penguin (book), a children's picture book by Polly Dunbar
Penguin (character), a villain in the Batman comic books
Penguin (film), a 2020 Indian film
Penguins (film), a 2019 Disneynature documentary film
The Penguins, an American doo-wop band
The Penguins of Madagascar, or simply Penguins, an animated television series
"Penguins", an episode of the television series Teletubbies
Nickname for the nun who ran the Catholic orphanage in The Blues Brothers (film)
Opus the Penguin, from the comic strip Bloom County by Berkeley Breathed
"Penguin", a 2011 song by Christina Perri from Lovestrong

Businesses
Penguin (restaurant), a restaurant in Nahariya, Israel
Penguin Group, a publishing company
Penguin Books, the British arm of the Penguin Group
Penguin Software, a 1980s video game publisher
The Penguin, a Wilmington, North Carolina radio station brand that has broadcast on WGHJ, WFBT (FM), and WUIN (FM)
Original Penguin, an American clothing brand

Food
Penguin Mints, a brand of caffeinated mints
Penguin (biscuit), a brand of chocolate biscuit

Military
, various Royal Navy ships
USS Penguin, three United States Navy ships
, various Royal Australian Navy ships and shore installations
Penguin (missile), an anti-ship missile in service since 1972

People
Parit Chiwarak, Thai democracy activist
George Mitchell (Irish criminal)

Places
Penguin, Tasmania, Australia, a town
Penguin Island (disambiguation)
Penguin Islands, Namibia
Penguin Islands (Newfoundland and Labrador), Canada
Penguin River, South Georgia Island
Penguin Bay, South Georgia Island
Penguin Bight, Seymour Island
Penguin Heights, Queen Maud Land, Antarctica
Penguin Point (disambiguation), three points in the Antarctic

Sports
Pittsburgh Penguins, a National Hockey League team
Wilkes-Barre/Scranton Penguins, an American Hockey League team
Krefeld Pinguine, a Deutsche Eishockey Liga team also known as the Krefeld Penguins
Penguin Football Club, an Australian rules football club based in Penguin, Tasmania
Dominican Penguins, the sports teams of Dominican University of California
Youngstown State Penguins, the sports teams of Youngstown State University
Penguin (dinghy), a class of racing sailboat
Ron Cey (born 1948), American retired Major League Baseball player nicknamed "The Penguin"
Penguins Cup, an ice hockey tournament for over 80 high school teams from western Pennsylvania

Transportation
MV Penguin, a cargo liner in commission with the United States Bureau of Fisheries from 1930 to 1940 and with the United States Fish and Wildlife Service from 1940 to 1950
MV Penguin II, a United States Fish and Wildlife Service ship in commission from 1950 to 1963
SS Penguin, a New Zealand ferry which sank near Wellington in 1909
MacCready Gossamer Penguin, a solar-powered experimental aircraft
Antarctic Snow Cruiser, a 1930s vehicle designed for transport in Antarctic, also known as "The Penguin" and "Penguin 1"

Other uses
Penguin (solitaire), a card game
Google Penguin, an update to natural search engine rankings by Google
Penguin Award, an annual award given for excellence in broadcasting by the Television Society of Australia
Penguin High School, Penguin, Tasmania
An archaic name for the great auk

See also
Pinguin (disambiguation)